Janusz Małek (born 10 February 1958) is a Polish football defender.

References

1958 births
Living people
Polish footballers
Association football defenders
Stal Kraśnik players
Lech Poznań players
Polonia Bytom players
Szombierki Bytom players